The AEG C.I was a two-seat biplane reconnaissance aircraft produced in small numbers from March 1915 by the German company Allgemeine Elektrizitäts-Gesellschaft (AEG). It was essentially an AEG B.II armed with a single 7.92 mm (.312 in) Parabellum or Bergmann (rarely) machine gun mounted at the rear of the cockpit for the observer and a more powerful engine. The Benz engine increased maximum speed to a more respectable 130 km/h (81 mph). By October 1915, it had begun to be replaced by the AEG C.II.

Specifications (AEG C.I)

See also

References

Further reading
 Kroschel, Günter; Stützer, Helmut: Die deutschen Militärflugzeuge 1910-18, Wilhelmshaven 1977
 Munson, Kenneth: Bomber 1914–19, Zürich 1968, Nr. 20
 Nowarra, Heinz: Die Entwicklung der Flugzeuge 1914-18, München 1959
 Sharpe, Michael: Doppeldecker, Dreifachdecker & Wasserflugzeuge, Gondrom, Bindlach 2001, 

Biplanes
Single-engined tractor aircraft
C.I
1910s German military reconnaissance aircraft
Aircraft first flown in 1915